The Swiss National Supercomputing Centre (CSCS) is the national high-performance computing centre of Switzerland. It was founded in Manno, canton Ticino, in 1991. In March 2012, the CSCS moved to its new location in Lugano-Cornaredo.

The main function of the Swiss National Supercomputing Centre is a so-called National User Lab. It is open to all Swiss researchers and their assistants, who can get free access to CSCS' supercomputers in a competitive scientific evaluation process. In addition, the centre operates dedicated computing facilities for specific research projects and national mandates, e.g. weather forecasting. It is the national competence centre for high-performance computing and serves as a technology platform for Swiss research in computational science. CSCS is an autonomous unit of the Swiss Federal Institute of Technology in Zurich (ETH Zurich) and closely collaborates with the local University of Lugano (USI).

Building 

The building at the new location Lugano-Cornaredo has a pillar-free machine hall of 2,000 m and can be powered with up to 20 MW electricity. Water for cooling the supercomputers is taken from Lake Lugano in 45m depth and pumped over a distance of 2.8 km to the centre. Thus, little energy is consumed for providing the cooling and the computer centre achieves a high energy efficiency with a  PUE < 1.25.

Supercomputers 
Supercomputer procurements at CSCS can be categorised into two phases: In the first phase from 1991 to 2011, the centre focused on proven technologies in order to facilitate user access to its services. This strategy was centred on the SX vector processor architecture of NEC. The IBM SP4, installed 2002, was the first production system of CSCS with a massively-parallel computer architecture. The procurement of the first Cray XT3 in Europe in 2005 marked the beginning of the second phase. Since then, CSCS concentrates on early technologies, preferably before they become a generally available product.

Current computing facilities

Previous computing facilities

National Supercomputing Service 
Run as a user lab, CSCS promotes and encourages top-notch research. Simulations created on supercomputers yield completely new insights in science. Consequently, CSCS operates cutting-edge computer systems as an essential service facility for Swiss researchers. These computers aid scientists with diverse issues and requirements - from the pure calculation of complex problems to analysis of complex data. The pool of national high-performance computers is available to its users as a so-called user lab: all researchers in and out of Switzerland can use the supercomputer infrastructure.

Dedicated HPC Services 
In addition to the computers of the User Lab, CSCS operates dedicated compute resources for strategic research projects and tasks of national interest. Since 2001, the calculations for the numerical weather prediction of the Swiss meteorological survey MeteoSwiss take place at the Swiss National Supercomputing Centre. In January 2008, the first operational high-resolution weather forecasting suite in Europe was taken in production on a massively-parallel supercomputer at CSCS. Another dedicated computer resource operated by CSCS is the Swiss tier-2 computer cluster for the Computing Grid of the CERN LHC accelerator.

CSCS also provides storage services for massive data sets of the Swiss systems biology initiative SystemsX and the Centre for Climate Systems Modelling C2SM at ETH Zurich.

Research and development 
For supporting the further development of its supercomputing services, CSCS regularly evaluates relevant new technologies (technology scouting) and publishes the results as white papers on its website.

In 2009, CSCS and the University of Lugano jointly launched the platform HP2C with the goal to prepare the application codes of Swiss researchers for upcoming supercomputer architectures.

Notes and references

See also 

 Science and technology in Switzerland
 Supercomputing in Europe
 TOP500

External links 
 
 Current Computers

Supercomputer sites
Science and technology in Switzerland
ETH Zurich
Buildings and structures in Ticino
1991 establishments in Switzerland
Institutes associated with CERN